Gary Lee Morrison (born November 8, 1955) is a retired American professional ice hockey player. He played in 43 National Hockey League (NHL) games with the Philadelphia Flyers over parts of three seasons.

Personal life
Morrison met his wife Liza Pederson at the University of Michigan in 1973. They were both competing as athletes for the University of Michigan; Pederson as a swimmer and Morrison as a hockey player. After marrying in 1982 they had three children together.

References

External links
 

1955 births
American ice hockey forwards
Ice hockey players from Michigan
Living people
Maine Mariners players
Michigan Wolverines men's ice hockey players
Milwaukee Admirals players
People from Farmington, Michigan
Philadelphia Flyers draft picks
Philadelphia Flyers players
Phoenix Roadrunners draft picks